Clifford Gene "Cliff" Balsom (born 25 March 1946) is an English former professional footballer who played in the Football League for Torquay United. He was born in Torquay, Devon.

A full back, he began his career as an apprentice with Torquay United, making his debut at the age of 17 on 25 January 1964 against York City at Bootham Crescent. In June 196, he was transferred to Swindon Town after only four league games for the Gulls. He failed, however, to make the first team at Swindon, returned to Torquay United, but not to their first team, and left league football.

References

1946 births
Living people
Sportspeople from Torquay
English footballers
Association football fullbacks
Torquay United F.C. players
English Football League players
Swindon Town F.C. players